Alan Parkinson may refer to:

Alan Parkinson (footballer), English footballer
Alan Parkinson (engineer), nuclear engineer, author, and whistleblower